Jacek Góralski (born 21 September 1992) is a Polish professional footballer who plays as a midfielder for Bundesliga side VfL Bochum and the Poland national team.

Club career
Góralski began his career with Zawisza Bydgoszcz, but left for Victoria Koronowo on a free in early 2011. He joined Bulgarian champions Ludogorets Razgrad in the summer of 2017, signing a three-year contract.

On 19 January 2020, Góralski moved to Kairat on a three-year contract. On 16 June 2022, Kairat announced that Góralski was leaving the club. It was announced on 17 June 2022 that Góralski had joined VfL Bochum.

International career

In November 2016 Góralski received his first call-up to the senior Poland squad for matches against Romania and Slovenia. He started the match against Slovenia, which resulted in a 1–1 draw.

On 4 June 2018, Góralski was included in Adam Nawałka's 23-man squad for the 2018 FIFA World Cup in Russia. Góralski played in two games in the tournament, against Colombia, a 0–3 loss, and Japan, a 1–0 victory.

Career statistics

Club

International

Scores and results list Poland's goal tally first, score column indicates score after each Góralski goal.

Honours
Ludogorets
Bulgarian League: 2017–18, 2018–19, 2019–20
Bulgarian Supercup: 2019

Kairat
Kazakhstan Premier League: 2020
Kazakhstan Cup: 2021

References

External links

1992 births
Living people
Sportspeople from Bydgoszcz
Polish footballers
Association football midfielders
Poland international footballers
2018 FIFA World Cup players
Ekstraklasa players
I liga players
II liga players
First Professional Football League (Bulgaria) players
Kazakhstan Premier League players
Bundesliga players
Zawisza Bydgoszcz players
Wisła Płock players
Jagiellonia Białystok players
PFC Ludogorets Razgrad players
FC Kairat players
VfL Bochum players
Polish expatriate footballers
Polish expatriate sportspeople in Bulgaria
Expatriate footballers in Bulgaria
Polish expatriate sportspeople in Kazakhstan
Expatriate footballers in Kazakhstan
Polish expatriate sportspeople in Germany
Expatriate footballers in Germany